Bjelland og Grindum or Bjelland og Grindheim is a former municipality in the old Vest-Agder county, Norway.  The administrative centre of the municipality was the village of Bjelland where Bjelland Church is located.  The  municipality existed from 1838 until 1902. It was located in the Mandalen valley in the northern parts of the present-day municipalities of Lyngdal and Lindesnes in what is now Agder county.

History
The old (large) parish of Bjelland was divided on 1 January 1838 into two municipalities: Aaseral in the north and Bjelland og Grindum in the south (see formannskapsdistrikt law). Bjelland og Grindum had a population of 1,662 in 1835, just before the split.

On 1 January 1902, the municipality of Bjelland og Grindum was dissolved and its land was split into two new municipalities: Bjelland (population: 907) and Grindheim  (population: 909). These municipalities later became parts of Audnedal and Marnardal.

See also
List of former municipalities of Norway

References

Lyngdal
Lindesnes
Former municipalities of Norway
1838 establishments in Norway
1902 disestablishments in Norway